U.S. Route 101 (US 101) is a major north–south United States Numbered Highway, stretching from Los Angeles, California, to Tumwater, Washington. The California portion of US 101 is one of the last remaining and longest U.S. Routes still active in the state, and the longest highway of any kind in California. US 101 was also one of the original national routes established in 1926. Significant portions of US 101 between the Los Angeles area and the San Francisco Bay Area follow El Camino Real, the commemorative route connecting the former Alta California's 21 missions.

Although the highway has been superseded in overall importance for transportation through the state by Interstate 5 (I-5), US 101 continues to be the major coastal north–south route that links the Greater Los Angeles Area, the Central Coast, the San Francisco Bay Area, and the North Coast (Redwood Empire). Generally referred to as "101" by residents of Northern California, in Southern California it is often called "The 101" (pronounced "the one oh one"). The highway has portions designated as the Santa Ana Freeway, the Hollywood Freeway, the Ventura Freeway, South Valley Freeway, and Bayshore Freeway, as well as El Camino Real in many non-freeway segments. The Redwood Highway, the  northernmost segment of the highway, begins at the Golden Gate and passes through the world's tallest and only extensive preserves of virgin, old-growth coast redwood trees.

Route description 

US 101 is part of the California Freeway and Expressway System, and is part of the National Highway System, a network of highways that are considered essential to the country's economy, defense, and mobility by the Federal Highway Administration.

Portions of US 101 are eligible to be included in the State Scenic Highway System. It is officially designated as a scenic highway by the California Department of Transportation (Caltrans) from Goleta to Las Cruces in Santa Barbara County, and through Del Norte Coast Redwoods State Park in Del Norte County. This designation means that there are substantial sections of highway passing through a "memorable landscape" with no "visual intrusions", where the potential designation has gained popular favor with the community.

Los Angeles to Ventura 
This southernmost portion is named the Santa Ana Freeway, inheriting that title as the northerly extension of the roadway now known as I-5. US 101 heads north for  before merging with the western end of the San Bernardino Freeway (I-10).

After merging with westbound traffic from the San Bernardino Freeway (I-10), US 101 then proceeds northwest via the Downtown Slot under the northern edge of Los Angeles' Civic Center to State Route 110 (SR 110) at the Four Level Interchange. From here, US 101 becomes the Hollywood Freeway. It then passes through the L.A. neighborhoods of Echo Park, Silver Lake, and Los Feliz and heads to Hollywood and up through the Cahuenga Pass before reaching the San Fernando Valley.

US 101 passes right next to the Universal Studios Hollywood and then intersects with SR 134 and SR 170 at the interchange known as the Hollywood Split. Here, the alignment of US 101 shifts to the alignment of SR 134 (i.e. heading northbound, the road's alignment turns left, or westbound) and thereafter is referred to as the Ventura Freeway until it reaches Ventura. Though confusing, the "Hollywood Freeway" name continues northward from this interchange on SR 170, and the "Ventura Freeway" name continues eastward to SR 134.

From the Hollywood Split, US 101 is an east–west highway (until it reaches Gaviota State Park in Santa Barbara County where it shifts back to a north–south alignment). It meets with I-405 in Sherman Oaks, an interchange which holds claim to the most traveled intersection in the nation. The east–west geographical alignment of the Ventura Freeway and the north–south designation which appears on the freeway signs can be confusing to visitors; the same freeway entrance can often be signed as "101 North" and "101 West"; this is most common in the San Fernando Valley where the local E/W signing does not match the Caltrans' proper statewide N/S designation.

After the Conejo Grade, which is a 7% grade incline, the freeway enters the Oxnard Plain and runs concurrent with SR 1 for the first time. Upon reaching Ventura, there is an interchange with SR 126, which runs east to Santa Clarita.

Central Coast 
North of Santa Barbara, US 101 switches intermittently between freeway and expressway status (i.e. there is occasional cross-traffic), but there are no traffic signals until San Francisco. The last traffic signals along this stretch of the route were removed in 1991 when the section through downtown Santa Barbara was constructed to freeway standards after years of disagreement over the impact that the original elevated design would have on the community.

At Gaviota State Park, the highway shifts back from an east–west highway to a north–south alignment.

A few miles north of the Gaviota Tunnel, SR 1 splits from US 101 and heads northwest, running along the Pacific coastline parallel and to the west of US 101. US 101 passes through Buellton, Los Alamos, Orcutt, Santa Maria, and Nipomo. South of Santa Maria, US 101 widens from a four-lane highway to a six-lane freeway. SR 166 joins US 101 for about  before splitting just north of the city limits, while US 101 continues as a four-lane freeway before reverting to expressway status north of Nipomo.

Farther north, SR 1 rejoins US 101 between Pismo Beach and San Luis Obispo. Then US 101 takes an inland route through the Salinas Valley, while Highway 1 heads northwest, running along the Pacific coastline in California, parallel and to the west of US 101.

A steep segment (7% grade) between San Luis Obispo and Atascadero is known as the Cuesta Grade. North of Atascadero, the highway joins SR 46 for about  through Paso Robles.

From Paso Robles to Salinas, US 101 is an expressway known as the Salinas River Valley Highway, since the Salinas River Valley extends from Santa Margarita to the SR 156 junction in Prunedale. Near this point, the wide agricultural bottomlands of the Salinas Valley begins. North of King City, US 101 once again switches intermittently between freeway and expressway status, passing through Greenfield, Soledad, Gonzales, and Chualar before reaching Salinas. After crossing the San Benito County line, SR 156 splits from US 101 near San Juan Bautista while US 101 continues northward mostly as a four-lane highway until it reaches Gilroy.

San Francisco Bay Area 
US 101 crosses the Pajaro River into Santa Clara County as a four-lane highway, with an interchange at SR 25 a few miles later. Upon reaching Gilroy, it becomes the South Valley Freeway (as in South Santa Clara Valley), and at the same time, it expands to three lanes in each direction. It then enters Silicon Valley when reaching Morgan Hill, and shortly afterwards expands to four lanes in each direction, with an HOV lane in the middle, before reaching San Jose. From San Jose to San Francisco, US 101 is known as the Bayshore Freeway as it passes through Palo Alto and the other major communities along the San Francisco Peninsula.

US 101 is called the James Lick Freeway, named for James Lick, a philanthropist, from the San Francisco county/city line, through the interchange with I-280 at the Alemany Maze, until the junction with the San Francisco Skyway (I-80) and the Central Freeway near the city's Civic Center. US 101 continues in a northwestern direction on the Central Freeway, and then leaves the freeway, on Mission Street (northbound) and South Van Ness Avenue (southbound), to run north on Van Ness Avenue. At the intersection of Van Ness Avenue and Lombard Street, US 101 heads west on Lombard Street, and then on Richardson Avenue, entering The Presidio, where it becomes a divided highway again (the Presidio Parkway). It is then joined by Route 1 before approaching and crossing the Golden Gate Bridge.

From San Francisco north the highway is heavily traveled by commuters through to Windsor, just north of Santa Rosa. North of the Golden Gate Bridge, US 101 enters Marin County and is known as the Redwood Highway. Upon exiting the tunnel, it passes above the hillside town of Sausalito and descends to Richardson Bay, where SR 1 splits from the freeway and heads to the coast. US 101 then passes through Mill Valley, Corte Madera, Larkspur, San Rafael and Novato, before entering Sonoma County. The section between Novato in Marin County and Petaluma in Sonoma County changes from its original six or eight lanes through Marin to four lanes, creating a bottleneck, and is thus called the "Novato Narrows" by locals. The Narrows continue up to the county line between Marin and Sonoma Counties. The entire area between Novato and Petaluma is also the voter approved Novato–Petaluma Community Separator, which forbids most development.

Upon entering Sonoma County, the freeway widens again to six lanes from the county line to Windsor, passing through Petaluma, Cotati, Rohnert Park, and Santa Rosa. Upon reaching Windsor, the freeway returns to two lanes in each direction, crossing the Russian River in Healdsburg and then following the river up the Alexander Valley. SR 128 joins US 101 in the town of Geyserville before splitting just north of Cloverdale. US 101 then heads up a steep hill just before leaving Sonoma County and entering Mendocino County.

North Coast 
US 101 crosses into Mendocino County as a freeway for one mile (1.6 km), but then narrows to an expressway through the Russian River canyon and eventually a two-lane road south of Hopland, the first time since leaving San Francisco. Just before reaching Ukiah, US 101 becomes a four-lane freeway. In the community of Calpella, SR 20 merges with US 101 for the next  to Willits. The freeway portion ends as the combined US 101 and SR 20 ascend the  Ridgewood Summit, the highest elevation along the route's  trek through California. As US 101 resumes freeway status just south of Willits, SR 20 splits from US 101 shortly before it suddenly reverts to a 2-lane undivided freeway and eventually a highway north of Willits.

US 101 then widens to a four-lane expressway until the intersection with the western portion of SR 162, where it reverts to a two-lane road. North of Laytonville, US 101 ascends Rattlesnake summit before a descent to follow the South Fork Eel River and Eel River all the way to Fortuna near the mouth of the river. SR 271 is the old portion of US 101 through this area. At Leggett, US 101 meets SR 1 for the last time, and from this point until Piercy, US 101 runs along a section of highway with frequent landslides. Caltrans bypassed the most difficult section in 2009 with unique construction of two bridges known collectively as the Confusion Hill Bridges. This project, funded by an emergency act from the State Legislature, moved the highway across the Eel River away from the troubled spots to prevent disruption in commerce and travel from infrequent, but costly, winter closures on the main transportation route to the far North Coast. North of Piercy, the freeway portion again ends and the road narrows down to two lanes, before another stretch of divided highway.

Arriving in Humboldt County, another narrow two-lane portion of US 101 bisects Richardson Grove State Park. Because of the narrow lanes and the redwood trees that tower over this segment of the highway, standard-sized trucks in compliance with the Surface Transportation Assistance Act (STAA) are prohibited through the park. Just after the park boundary, the highway switches to a short undivided freeway and then eventually a divided freeway just before reaching Garberville. North of Garberville, US 101 reverts to an undivided freeway, which continuing north by northwest, passes through the  Humboldt Redwoods State Park, California's third largest State Park and the site of the largest remaining Redwood old growth forest in the world. US 101 again switches to another stretch of divided freeway near the town Pepperwood before reverting to a short, 2-mile (3 km) expressway just north of Stafford. A short freeway then runs through Rio Dell before another short, 3-mile (5 km) expressway.

Shortly before reaching the western terminus of SR 36, US 101 becomes a freeway again between Fortuna and Eureka. North of Humboldt Hill, the road enters the City of Eureka (a potential new freeway cutting through or bypass of the city was successfully blocked repeatedly). As the route traverses Eureka, the southern portion is known as "Broadway" and then as it bears east along Humboldt Bay, the Highway is aligned on a one-way couplet (4th and 5th streets).  later the highway leaves Eureka's northern city limit and continues north. The expressway style section between Eureka and Arcata, which is also a safety corridor, is named the "Michael J. Burns Freeway," in honor of the State Senator who was a proponent of California's Highways. The highway becomes an unobstructed freeway south of the center of Arcata. Proceeding north it passes the junction for SR 299 (also the western terminus for that route), in the Valley West (northernmost) part of the college town.

The highway continues north as it skirts westerly around McKinleyville on a high bluff north of the Mad River. As the highway reaches Clam Beach (a county park), motorists get their first magnificent full view of the Pacific Ocean north of the Golden Gate. North of Trinidad, the highway narrows to one lane in each direction after crossing Big Lagoon to pass inland of Stone Lagoon and follow the coastal bar between Freshwater Lagoon and the Pacific Ocean south of Orick. It becomes a  undivided freeway through Redwood National and State Parks running inland east of the Prairie Creek Redwoods State Park boundary. The freeway narrows to one lane in each direction at the Klamath River before losing its freeway designation in Klamath. The original placement of the highway near giant Coast Redwoods led to increased awareness of the destruction of the redwoods after decades of extensive logging, which ultimately led to the establishment of Redwood National Park in 1968. The original highway segment through Prairie Creek Redwoods State Park is now a scenic alternate similar to Avenue of the Giants, named Newton B. Drury Scenic Parkway in honor of the fourth director of the National Park Service and executive director of the Save-the-Redwoods League

North of the town of Klamath just inside Del Norte County, the highway closely follows the Pacific coast again. In Crescent City, US 101 once again separates into a one-way couplet (L and M Streets) for nine blocks. As it leaves Crescent City, US 101 becomes a divided freeway for the last time in California (built slightly to the west of the original two-lane alignment, now called Parkway Drive). As the 3-mile divided freeway portion ends, US 101 intersects the southern terminus of US 199, which heads northeast as the Redwood Highway, passing through the Collier Tunnel and terminating in Grants Pass, Oregon. US 101 (no longer called the "Redwood Highway" at this point) is reduced to two lanes and continues north along the California coast until it reaches the Oregon border.

Tolls

Express lanes
High-occupancy toll (HOT) lanes along US 101 between SR 237 in Mountain View and Whipple Avenue in Redwood City opened on February 11, 2022. These express lanes were extended to I-380 in San Bruno on March 3, 2023, and are planned to be extended further south to I-880 in San Jose in Fall 2026.

, the HOT lanes' hours of operation is weekdays between 5:00 am and 8:00 pm. Solo drivers are tolled using a congestion pricing system based on the real-time levels of traffic. Two-person carpools and clean air vehicles with a solo driver are charged 50 percent of the posted toll. Carpools with three or more people and motorcycles are not charged. All tolls are collected using an open road tolling system, and therefore there are no toll booths to receive cash. Each vehicle using the HOT lanes is required to carry either a FasTrak Flex or CAV (Clean Air Vehicle) transponder, with its switch set to indicate the number of the vehicle's occupants (1, 2, or 3 or more). Solo drivers may also use the FasTrak standard tag without the switch. Drivers without any FasTrak tag will be assessed a toll violation regardless of whether they qualified for free.

The segment of the express lanes in Santa Clara County is co-administered by the Santa Clara Valley Transportation Authority (VTA) while the segment in San Mateo County is co-administered by the separate San Mateo County Express Lanes Joint Powers Authority, and so drivers will see separate toll charges when using each segment.

Golden Gate Bridge

Tolls are collected only for southbound traffic on the Golden Gate Bridge headed to San Francisco. An open road tolling system is also used on the bridge, and they can be paid by either a FasTrak transponder or license plate tolling. The high-occupancy vehicle (HOV) lane leading to the bridge requires a car with three or more people.

History

Juan Bautista de Anza National Historic Trail 
The US 101 Highway is part of the auto tour route of the Juan Bautista de Anza National Historic Trail, a National Park Service unit in the United States National Historic Trail and National Millennium Trail programs.  In 2005, Caltrans began posting signs on roads that overlap with the historic 1776 Juan Bautista de Anza trail route, so that California drivers can now follow the trail.

Historic route: San Diego to Los Angeles 

Instead of terminating in Los Angeles, US 101 once continued all the way south through San Diego to the United States–Mexico border in San Ysidro. However, this part was decommissioned on July 1, 1964, in favor of I-5. Though much of U.S. Route 101 has been superseded by I-5, several street segments of former Route 101 exist.

Historic route in San Diego County
Much of the route in northern San Diego County is County Route S21; this includes Coast Highway in Oceanside, Carlsbad Boulevard in Carlsbad, Coast Highway 101 in Encinitas, Camino del Mar in Del Mar, and Torrey Pines Road in Torrey Pines.  In San Diego, one alignment entered La Jolla Village on La Jolla Blvd, while a newer alignment went through Rose Canyon under what is now I-5.  Roads followed by US-101 in San Diego included Mission Bay Drive, Pacific Hwy, Harbor Drive and Main Street.  It ran along National City Blvd in National City, Broadway in Chula Vista and Beyer Blvd in San Ysidro.

Oceanside–Carlsbad freeway bypass
By the early 1950s, traffic had become very heavy on US 101 through Oceanside and Carlsbad. The US 101 freeway bypass (Oceanside-Carlsbad freeway bypass) was built in 1953 and completed in 1955 by the California Department of Public Works (now Caltrans) and brought up by the San Diego Highway Development Association on a US 80/US 101 discussion on how to resolve the huge traffic loads on US 101 in Oceanside. Today it is part of I-5 and Palomar Airport Road. It follows I-5 from Coast Highway (former Hill Street exit) in Oceanside to Palomar Airport Road in Carlsbad. From there the US 101 bypass went onto Palomar Airport Road to merge with US 101 Bus. on Carlsbad Boulevard. As it approached the Coast Highway/SR 76 exit on southbound I-5 in Oceanside, US 101 Bus. split off. US 101 Bus. followed the original US 101 through downtown Oceanside and Carlsbad as former Hill Street/Carlsbad Boulevard (CR S-21) while the US 101 freeway followed modern I-5 and Palomar Airport Road. The south end of the freeway bypass is Carlsbad Boulevard and Palomar Airport Road and the north end is I-5 and the Coast Highway/SR 76 exit. The south end was modified after US 101 was decommissioned between the East Los Angeles Interchange in Los Angeles and the Mexican border in San Ysidro. This freeway construction by the California Department of Public Works put US 101 on an all new highway route alignment to relieve Oceanside and Carlsbad of their very heavy bumper-to-bumper burdensome traffic problem. Also before the bypass in the 1950s, US 101 followed North Coast Highway (formerly Hill Street) from San Luis Rey Mission Expressway (SR 76 and north end of the Oceanside–Carlsbad freeway bypass) to Harbor Drive. From there it followed Harbor Drive to Vandergrift Boulevard, San Rafael Drive, and the freeway onramp for I-5 north near the Camp Pendleton north entrance guardhouse gate. It merges with the I-5 northbound onramp to shoot onto the southbound lanes of I-5 to follow the freeway lanes all the way to Las Pulgas Road in Camp Pendleton.

Historic route in Orange and Los Angeles Counties
An old orphaned alignment of US 101, that ran through the cities of Mission Viejo, Laguna Niguel, San Juan Capistrano, Dana Point, and San Clemente, was located in south Orange County. The old roadway, from a dead end just west of I-5 and east of the railroad tracks in Mission Viejo to Cristianitos Road in San Clemente, followed Camino Capistrano, Doheny Park Road, Coast Highway and El Camino Real. It had interchanges with I-5 and California State Route 1. It was replaced by the San Diego freeway (which US 101 became part of it in 1958) and finally replaced by I-5 in 1968.

In northern Orange County, US 101 followed Harbor Boulevard.  U.S. Route 101 left Orange County, traversed southeast Los Angeles County, and entered the City of Los Angeles along Whittier Boulevard.

El Camino Real: Los Angeles to San Francisco 
Significant portions of US 101 from its southern terminus to the San Francisco Bay Area is designated as the Royal Road or El Camino Real. The route roughly follows the historic trail that connected the former Alta California's 21 missions.

Before the Golden Gate Bridge was completed in 1937, there was regular vehicle ferry service across the Golden Gate strait, running from the Hyde Street Pier to  Sausalito. Under the California Streets and Highways Code § 401, the Golden Gate Bridge is legally not part of US 101. The portion of US 101 starting from Los Angeles ends at "the approach to the Golden Gate Bridge" and then resumes at "a point in Marin County opposite San Francisco" to the Oregon state line. The bridge itself is maintained by the Golden Gate Bridge, Highway and Transportation District instead of Caltrans.

From the 1940s to 1991, various segments of US 101 between Los Angeles and San Francisco were upgraded to either a freeway or expressway. In the Los Angeles area, the first segment of the Hollywood Freeway through the Cahuenga Pass opened in 1940, while the segment from the San Fernando Valley to Downtown Los Angeles opened in 1954, replacing Cahuenga Boulevard. The Ventura Freeway then opened in 1960, replacing Ventura Boulevard. The segment of the original two-lane alignment between Emma Wood State Beach north to the Mobil Pier Undercrossing near Sea Cliff, which followed the historic Rincon Sea Level Road, was the re-signed as part of SR 1.

In the San Francisco Bay Area, US 101 was originally divided. US 101W followed the same general right-of-way of today's US 101 through the region, primarily along what was originally signed as Bayshore Boulevard. US 101E then generally followed the right-of-way taken by today's I-880 from San Jose to Oakland, then across the Carquinez Bridge to follow what is now SR 37, joining US 101W. The US 101E designation was removed by the 1940s and became SR 17 (later designated as I-880 and the westernmost section I-580), running from San Jose to Oakland and then across the Richmond–San Rafael Bridge. Meanwhile, Bayshore Boulevard was later redesignated as the US 101A bypass and then eventually upgraded to what is now the Bayshore Freeway. The first stretch that was completed between Redwood City and South San Francisco was the Bay Area's first freeway when it opened in 1947. After the entire Bayshore Freeway was completed in the early 1960s, the old alignment along the peninsula was renumbered and renamed as SR 82/El Camino Real.

Various other freeway or expressway bypasses along the California Central Coast were also built. In 1991, the last traffic signal along US 101 between Los Angeles and San Francisco was taken down in Santa Barbara. The primary control city that is listed on freeway signs along northbound US 101 through the Central Coast region remains San Francisco.

As the result of freeway revolts in San Francisco in the 1950s, a direct freeway connection through the city to the Golden Gate Bridge has never been built. The Central Freeway was completed to extend from the Bayshore Freeway to Turk Street in 1959, before the San Francisco Board of Supervisors voted to remove the remainder of the Central Freeway and most other proposed freeways from the city's highway plan. For decades, southbound traffic on US 101 flowed on the one-way Turk Street from Van Ness Avenue to the Central Freeway, while northbound traffic used the parallel Golden Gate Avenue. After the 1989 Loma Prieta earthquake damaged the structure, the segment of the Central Freeway north of Market Street was replaced with the surface-level Octavia Boulevard; traffic on US 101 was then eventually re-routed to exit south of that at Mission Street/South Van Ness Avenue. With no direct freeway along US 101 through the City of San Francisco, the old US 101E/I-880/I-580 route remains as a faster bypass through the Bay Area.

In the wake of the dot-com bubble expansion, the segment of US 101 between Morgan Hill and San Jose, also known as the Sig Sanchez Freeway, expanded to eight lanes between Cochrane Road and SR 85 exits between 2001 and 2003 and a new interchange at Bailey Avenue, which had been planned since the 1970s, opened in 2004. Originally, the ten-mile segment was only four lanes (it was planned to have six lanes when opened in 1984). The improved segment was to alleviate the consistent congestion that had expanded as far south as Masten Avenue coming from Gilroy, and as far north as Bernal Road coming from San Jose. Traffic now typically only runs slow between the Bailey Avenue and East Dunne Avenue exits.

The interchange at the beginning of I-280 and I-680 in San Jose was constructed years before its completion. It became the butt of many local jokes. The highlight prank occurred in January 1976, when a 1960 Chevrolet Impala was placed on the highest bridge overnight, where it obviously would be impossible to drive. The following day, San Jose City Councilman Joe Colla was photographed standing next to the car, a photo which was circulated across many newspapers. It has been suggested this stunt nudged the wheels of progress to find the funds to complete the freeway. In 2010, the interchange was named the Joe Colla Interchange.

Redwood Highway: Marin County to Del Norte County 

An abandoned segment of the Redwood Highway, US 101, located in the Redwood National and State Parks near Klamath was added to the National Register of Historic Places in 1979.

Freeway segments along the Redwood Highway portion of US 101 are not as prevalent as along the Los Angeles-San Francisco route. A notable segment of the old US 101 alignment is SR 254, also known as the Avenue of the Giants, in Humboldt Redwoods State Park. The freeway bypassing this scenic route, surrounded by towering Coast Redwoods, was completed in 1960. Several bridges along the segment of highway running along the Eel River were destroyed during the Christmas flood of 1964.

Construction on a freeway segment bypassing Willits began in 2013. The bypass around Willits remained controversial because the intended route goes through protected wetlands. Construction was halted by US Army Corps of Engineers in June 2014 and work restarted the following month after Caltrans committed to extensive mitigation of the project. The  bypass around Willits opened to traffic in November 2016. The bypass included a  viaduct going over a flood plain. The freeway segment cost $459 million to complete, 50% more than what Caltrans first reported when it opened. 

The city of Eureka has long resisted a freeway through it.

Future
The proposed Wallis Annenberg Wildlife Crossing is a vegetated overpass spanning the Ventura Freeway and Agoura Road at Liberty Canyon in Agoura Hills. If built, it will be one of the largest urban wildlife crossings in the United States, connecting the Simi Hills and the Santa Monica Mountains over a busy freeway with ten traffic lanes (including exit lanes).

The Richardson Grove section of US 101 has been proposed for a bypass for many years, but Caltrans conducted a study in 2000 which stated that a bypass was not cost effective and recommended realignment of US 101 within the redwood grove instead to accommodate modern-sized trucks in compliance with the Surface Transportation Assistance Act (STAA).

Major intersections

See also

References

External links 

Bay Area FasTrak – includes toll information on the US 101 Express Lanes, the Golden Gate Bridge and the other Bay Area toll facilities
Drive the 101: historical information website
California @ AARoads.com – U.S. Route 101
Caltrans: Route 101 highway conditions
California Highways: US 101

01-1
101
Roads on the National Register of Historic Places in California
101
U.S. Route A101
U.S. Route A101
U.S. Route A101
U.S. Route A101
U.S. Route A101
U.S. Route A101
U.S. Route A101
U.S. Route A101
U.S. Route A101
U.S. Route A101
U.S. Route A101
U.S. Route A101
U.S. Route A101
U.S. Route A101
101
101
 California
National Register of Historic Places in Del Norte County, California
National Register of Historic Places in Redwood National and State Parks